"Today Today" (sometimes shortened to "Today") is a song by the English New Wave band Cowboys International, released in February 1980 as a single. It is their last single to be released.

Review
Marshall Bowden of PopMatters said of the song in May 2004:

"Cowboys International are often credited with creating the blueprint for the New Romantic sound…Groups like ABC and Spandau Ballet tried very hard to create tracks like Cowboys' "Today", but they never achieved the kind of widescreen sound that the band does here, a perfectly realized balance between sweeping, romantic strings, broad washes of synthesizer color, and a rigid techno-beat.

Release history

Personnel
 Ken Lockie – Lead vocals 
 Jimmy Hughes – Bass
 Terry Chimes – Drums
 Marco Pirroni – Guitar 
 Evan Charles – Keyboards

References

1980 singles
Virgin Records singles